Lacisediminihabitans is a genus of bacteria from the family of Microbacteriaceae.

References

Actinomycetales
Bacteria genera